= Yunlong Park =

Urban park in Xuzhou, China

Coordinates: 34°14′41″N 117°08′59″E

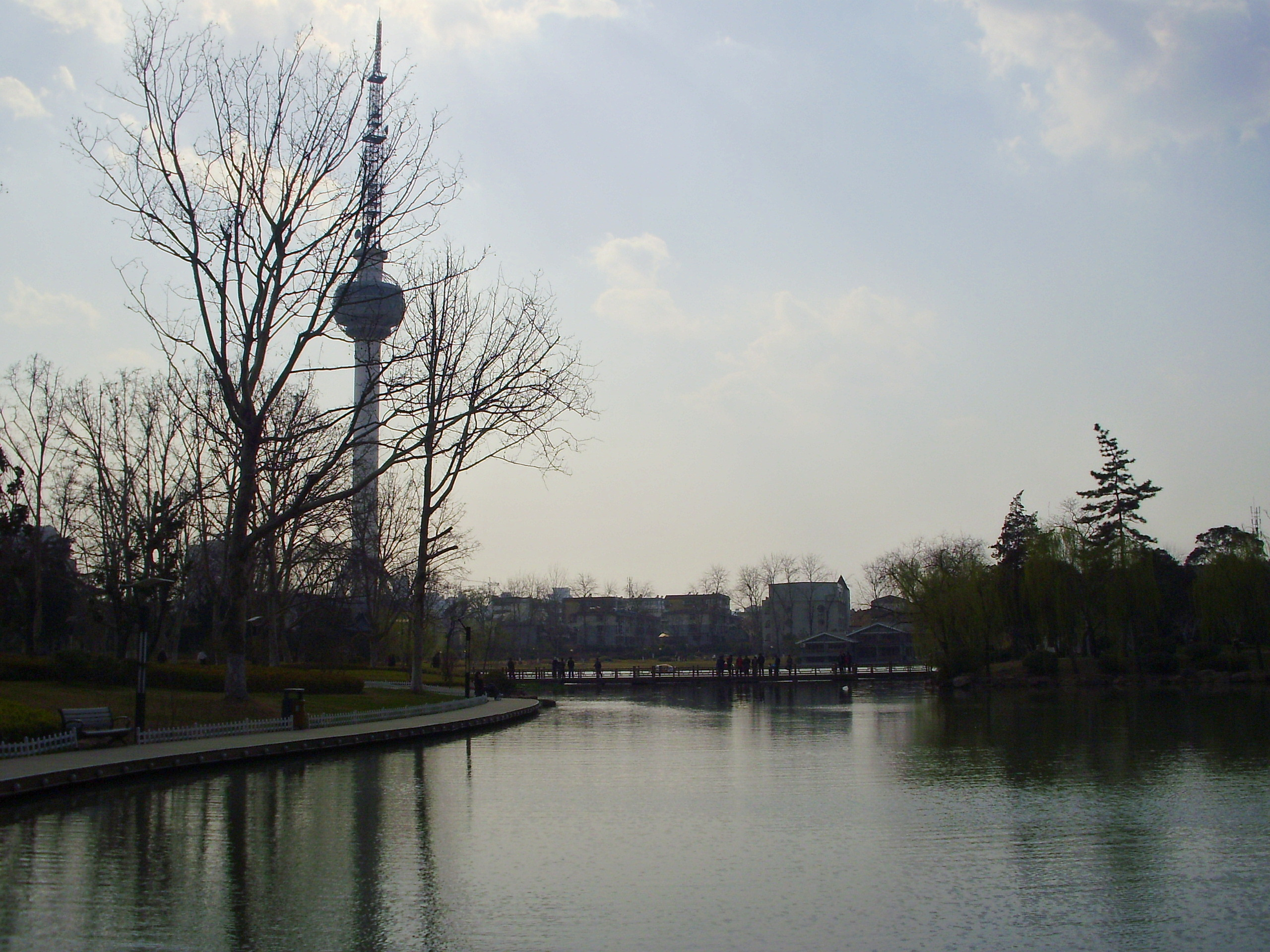
A lake in Yunlong Park, Xuzhou, Jiangsu, China

Yunlong Park (Chinese: 云龙公园) is an urban park built in 1958 in Xuzhou, Jiangsu, China. It was originally a cemetery built for the Christian and the Buddhist before Chinese Civil War.

== Name ==
In the 1950s, the city government intended to construct a park in memory of Yunlong Mountain and [Yunlong Lake], located to the north. It was eventually sited close to the city center and denominated by the name of Yun Long (means “cloud dragon” in Chinese).

== Geographical position ==
Yunlong Park is located in the southwest of Xuzhou, Jiangsu Province, in People's Republic of China. The park covers approximately an area of 25 hectares (62 acres), including 8 hectares (20 acres) of surface area.

== Features ==
=== the 6 main park attractions ===
Yun Park gains a good layout through learning from Chinese traditional gardens. The park consists of 6 parts, including the Bonsai Garden, Zhi chun Isle (知春岛), the Waterside of Lotus (荷花水榭), Galleries of Rockery and Flower, the Parterre and the Amusement Park.

=== the Swallow Pavilion ===
One of the most historic sight spots in the park is the Swallow Pavilion, which was initially built in Tang Dynasty. This ancient building has been destroyed in war and rebuilt many times over its long history. The present one was reconstructed in 1985 near the original site.

=== Han mausoleum ===
There is also a burial mound lying northeast of the park, covering an area of 400 m^{2} (4,300 sq ft). Evergreen trees can be seen everywhere upon stepping on that place. It is said to be a mausoleum of the Western Han Dynasty. All these spots help attract large numbers of visitors from home and abroad.

== Entrance ticket ==
Yunlong Park receives an amount of 1.7 million tourists on average each year. Access to the park is free.
